Baseer Ali is an Indian model and television personality known for winning Splitsvilla 10 and participating in Roadies Rising and Ace Of Space 2 where he emerged as a runner-up in both the shows.

Early life
Ali finished his schooling from Ivy League Academy and graduated from St. Mary's College, Hyderabad. Before participating in Roadies Rising, he was a YouTuber.

Career
Ali started his career in 2017 by participating in MTV India's Roadies Rising where he emerged as the runner-up. He then participated in Splitsvilla 10 and finished as the winner with Naina Singh.

In 2018, he hosted On Road With Roadies for Roadies Xtreme and Splitsvilla 11 with Divya Agarwal on Voot.

In March 2019, he hosted On Road With Roadies on Voot for Roadies: Real Heroes with Shruti Sinha. In August 2019, he participated in MTV India's Ace Of Space 2. After 72 days, he came out as the second runner-up.

In 2022, he participated in MTV Roadies 19 and finished at 7th place. 

In March 2023, Ali made his acting debut with Zee TV's Kundali Bhagya post-generation leap Shaurya Luthra opposite Sana Sayyad.

Media
Ali was ranked at No. 1 as Hyderabad's Most Desirable Man in 2017 by The Times of India.

He was also ranked in The Times Most Desirable Men at No. 17 in 2017.

Filmography

Television

References

External links

Indian male television actors
Living people
MTV Roadies contestants
Indian VJs (media personalities)
1996 births